Moritz Steinle (born 14 February 1983) is a German footballer.

External links

1983 births
Living people
German footballers
Stuttgarter Kickers players
Stuttgarter Kickers II players
3. Liga players
Footballers from Stuttgart
Association football defenders